Richard Edward Peralta, also known as Chad Peralta or Chad only, is a singer and actor from the Philippines.  He is a Filipino-Australian born in Sydney, Australia.

Education
Although Peralta was an information technology consultant, he is a musician who had already composed and written several songs in Tagalog and English.  He learned to play classic guitar at the age of twelve.

As an artist
Peralta first appeared on Philippine television at the Season 1 airing of Pinoy Dream Academy, among co-participants Panky Trinidad, Irish Fullerton, Jay-R Siaboc, Ronnie Liang, and Yeng Constantino.

Through ABS-CBN's Pinoy Dream Academy, Peralta was able to pursue his career as a musician in the Philippines.  While participating in the reality-oriented program, Peralta underwent training and undergone experiences in improving his talent in singing.  After several weeks, Nugen Music released his album composed of eleven of his songs, namely: "Promise", "Song for You", "Time Machine", "My Eyes Adored You", "Kasalanan", "Where Do I Begin?", "Realist", "I’ll Do Anything for You", "Kung Pwede Lang Sana", "I Don’t Know", and the acoustic version of "Song for You".  His songs use the pop rock and alternative pop genre, yet maintain the "mood of the song".

Songs
Among Peralta's songs are the following:
"Kasalanan"
"Realist"
"Tired of You"
"Kung Pwede Lang Sana"
"Song for You"
"Where Do I Begin?"
"My Eyes Adored You"
"Time Machine"

Notes

References

External links
Chad's Site
CHADDIKS Online Forum
Chaddiks.blogspot.com
Chad Peralta, "Two talented Pinoy musicians in Aus!", 14 November 2008, apojim.multiply.com

1985 births
Living people
Australian people of Filipino descent
Filipino male television actors
21st-century Filipino male singers
Filipino pop singers
Filipino rock musicians
Filipino rock singers
Filipino singer-songwriters
Musicians from Sydney
Pinoy Dream Academy participants
Star Magic
Male actors from Sydney